Oswald Thomas Colman Gomis (Sinhala: ඔස්වල්ඩ් තෝමස් කොල්මන් ගෝමිස්; 12 December 1932 – 3 February 2023) was the emeritus Roman Catholic Archbishop of Colombo and the former Chancellor of the University of Colombo (2002–2021). Msgr. Gomis' previous post was as the Bishop of Anuradhapura having been appointed in 1996. He was also the Auxiliary Bishop of Colombo from 1968 to 1996. He formally relinquished office and retired on 5 August 2009.

Early life
Born on 12 December 1932 in the city of Kelaniya, Gampaha district, Sri Lanka, Gomis attended St. Joseph's College and St. Benedict's College, Colombo and then entered the seminary in 1950. He was ordained priest on 3 February 1958. He was consecrated bishop on 17 July 1968. He has held several posts during his service in the Archdiocese, such as, Lecturer at St. Aloysius' Seminary, Colombo from 1958 to 1960, and Director cum Editor of the Catholic Press, Colombo from 1961 to 1968.

Social work

In order to assist children from villages outside Colombo he has been instrumental in founding various branch schools in the outer districts affiliated with the main colleges in Colombo. He has been involved in various aid schemes for the poor; construction of houses for tsunami victims, relief and rehabilitation work, and a scholarship programme for children affected by the tsunami in 2004. He has also donated a health centre to his hometown of Kelaniya.

Branch schools founded
St. Peter's College, Gampaha
St. Peter's College, Udugampola
Holy Cross College, Payagala
St. Joseph's College, Wattala
St. Joseph's College, Kadolkele
Loyola College, Bopitiya
Christ the King College, Weliweriya

Archbishop
On 6 July 2002, he was appointed Metropolitan Archbishop of Colombo by Pope John Paul II. He was installed as the Archbishop on 27 July 2002. Following his earlier appointment as the Secretary General of the Asian Bishops' Conferences, he was reappointed in the same year. He was also appointed by Pope Benedict XVI as a Synodal Father on 8 September 2005, and has met with him on 2 May 2007 to discuss the civil war situation in Sri Lanka. He is also the 3rd Archbishop of Colombo that is Sri Lankan, as following the erection of the Diocese by Pope Gregory XVI on 3 December 1834, all Archbishops until 1947 had been of foreign heritage. He retired on 5 August 2009.

Death
Gomis died on 3 February 2023, at the age of 90.

References

External links

Official site
Oswald Gomis at Catholic Hierarchy

1932 births
2023 deaths
Sinhalese priests
21st-century Roman Catholic archbishops in Sri Lanka
Alumni of Saint Joseph's College, Colombo
20th-century Roman Catholic bishops in Sri Lanka
Roman Catholic auxiliary bishops of Colombo
Roman Catholic archbishops of Colombo
Sri Lankan Roman Catholic archbishops
Bishops appointed by Pope John Paul II
People from Gampaha District